Manuel Portela y Valladares (Pontevedra, 31 January 1867 – Bandol, Provence-Alpes-Côte d'Azur, France 29 April 1952) was a Spanish political figure during the Second Spanish Republic. He served as the 43rd Attorney General of Spain between 1912 and 1913.

A member of the Liberal Party, he served as civil governor of Barcelona in 1910 and 1923, and as Minister of Promotion in September 1923.  After the socialist revolution against the republican government in October 1934, Alejandro Lerroux named him Minister of the Interior in 1935 and named 130th president of the government (prime minister) by Niceto Alcalá-Zamora on 14 December 1935 . He formed two governments prior to the elections of 16 February 1936 that the Popular Front won.

1867 births
1952 deaths
People from Pontevedra
Liberal Party (Spain, 1880) politicians
Prime Ministers of Spain
Government ministers of Spain
Members of the Congress of Deputies of the Spanish Restoration
Members of the Congress of Deputies of the Second Spanish Republic
Politicians from Galicia (Spain)
Spanish people of the Spanish Civil War (Republican faction)
Exiles of the Spanish Civil War in France
Interior ministers of Spain
Prosecutors general of Spain
Attorneys general of Spain